Vanilla hearts, or vaniljhjärtan in Swedish, is a type of pastry made of shortcrust dough formed into hearts, filled with vanilla cream, with powdered sugar sprinkled on top. They are usually found among the top-ten when it comes to Sweden's most liked small biscuits and cakes.

While the heart is the most common shape it can be baked in a variety of molds, such as pleated. In a recipe from 1913's edition of Prinsessornas kokbok they have a plain round shape and is called Norska linser (English: Norwegian lenses).

References 

Swedish pastries